Wolfgang Büttner (1 June 1912 - 18 November 1990) was a German actor. He appeared in more than one hundred films from 1950 to 1998.

Filmography

References

External links 

1912 births
1990 deaths
German male film actors